Ole Kristian Grimnes (born 4 January 1937, in Tromsø) is a Norwegian historian.

He was a professor in modern history at the University of Oslo, and is currently professor emeritus at the same university.

In particular he has worked with the periods 1890–1905 and 1940–1945 in Norwegian history.

He is a member of the Norwegian Academy of Science and Letters.

References

List of publications in FRIDA

1937 births
Living people
20th-century Norwegian historians
Writers from Tromsø
Academic staff of the University of Oslo
Members of the Norwegian Academy of Science and Letters